La malédiction is a French adventure video game developed by Fabien Privat for the Amstrad CPC and published in 1991 by Lankhor. In the game, a wizard named Xarton casts a curse upon the forest of Enar. The game was met with polarized reviews upon release.

Development 
The drawings for the game's art assets were all made by hand, then transferred to transparent millimeter paper to "pixelize" the scene, as Privat did not have access to a scanner.

Reception 
Ratings for the game cover a wide span from 20% to 76%.

References

External links 
 Joystick review
 Amstrad review
 MicroNews review
 Game manual

1991 video games
Adventure games
Amstrad CPC games
Amstrad CPC-only games
Video games developed in France
Lankhor games